Sneh Rana can refer to:

 Sneh Rana (cricketer), Indian cricketer
 Sneh Rana (sport shooter), Nepalese sport shooter